"I Found Out" is a song by the English musician John Lennon from his 1970 album John Lennon/Plastic Ono Band.

Writing and recording
The song expresses Lennon's disillusionment with a world dominated by what he saw as false religion and idols, and warns against being taken in by such beliefs.

Recorded at EMI Studios on 27 September 1970, the instrumentation, style, and production of the song are typical of Lennon's Plastic Ono Band era work. The song features a low, rumbling tremolo guitar, thumping drums, a rolling, minimal bass guitar line, and a scathing vocal delivery. The recording is bare-bones, in stark contrast to the heavy production of Lennon's later albums. It is influenced more heavily by blues music than other songs on Plastic Ono Band.

Reception
In a review for Plastic Ono Band, website Classic Rock Review described "I Found Out" as a "dark but fine tune", describing the bass line as the track's highlight.  Ultimate Classic Rock critic Nick DeRiso called "I Found Out" the most underrated song on John Lennon/Plastic Ono Band.

The song contains the line "Some of you sitting there with your cock in your hand", which was censored at the record company's request.

Personnel
The musicians who performed on the original recording were as follows:
John Lennon – vocals, fuzzed electric guitar
Ringo Starr – drums
Klaus Voormann – bass guitar

Popular culture
The song was covered by the Red Hot Chili Peppers on Working Class Hero: A Tribute to John Lennon.

The song has also been recorded by Nathaniel Mayer on I Just Want to Be Held (2004).

The song was featured during the end credits of the sixth episode of season three of The Marvelous Mrs.Maisel.

References

John Lennon songs
1970 songs
Songs critical of religion
Songs written by John Lennon
Song recordings produced by Phil Spector
Song recordings produced by John Lennon
Song recordings produced by Yoko Ono
Plastic Ono Band songs